

Studio albums

Singles

As featured artist

References

Joey Moe albums